Solar News Channel (SNC) was a major commercial television network in the Philippines, owned by Solar Entertainment Corporation's arm television subsidiary of Solar Television Network lease with its owner by Radio Philippines Network. Its flagship television station was DZKB-TV channel 9 in Mega Manila and other regional stations in the Philippines. The station was operational 18 hours a day from 6:00 AM to 12:00 MN on free TV, while 24 hours on cable, satellite and internet TV providers.

Most of its live programming from studios were located at Upper Ground Floor of the Worldwide Corporate Center, Shaw Boulevard corner Epifanio de los Santos Avenue in Mandaluyong with transmitter at No. 97, Panay Avenue, Brgy. South Triangle, Quezon City. The channel ceased to air on August 22, 2014, and was replaced with 9TV.

History

The network debuted on October 30, 2012, at 05:45 am (UTC +8:00) as a replacement for then all-news channel Talk TV on SBN 21—as such it is broadcast by all television service provider and terrestrial stations which formerly carried Talk TV.

It is the first all-English news channel to be aired on free TV in the Philippines, and the first channel of Solar Entertainment to air both on cable and free TV. Major part of the programming are local programs including news and current affairs programs from Solar News and foreign programs from NBC and CBS.

On December 1, 2013, Solar News Channel transferred to all RPN stations nationwide to widen its telecast while ETC returned to all SBN stations.

Aside from the transfer, Solar News Channel launched its own mobile application for smartphone users. Its consists of features such as live streaming, catch-up episodes and latest news from the network's website, solarnews.ph.

On August 13, 2014, Solar Television Network announced that Solar News Channel was to be replaced with 9TV by August 23, retaining the news and current affairs programming while expanding its weekend programming to cater more audiences which was started by the launching of "Kids Weekend" on August 23.

Programming
Solar News Channel's programming consists of rolling news coverage and other news programming, along with documentaries, current affairs show, talk show, entertainment, sports news. Most of the foreign programs on this news channel are from American TV networks such as NBC and CBS, with programs dedicated for infomercials, religious, pre-school, and children's programs.

Kids Programming

Educational
 Sesame Street

Cartoons
 Beware The Batman
 Care Bears
 Strawberry Shortcake: Berry Bitty Adventures
 Young Justice

Anime Series
 Pokémon the Series: XY

News Programming
 News.ph
 Serbisyo All Access
 Sports Desk
 Med Talk

Affiliate

See also
Radio Philippines Network
ETC (Solar Television Network's female-oriented channel, Solar News Channel's sister channels)
2nd Avenue (Solar Television Network's female and lifestyle channel, Solar News Channel's sister channels)
Jack City (Solar Television Network's general entertainment channel, Solar News Channel's sister channels)
Solar Television Network (the network's parent local channels)
Solar Entertainment Corporation
Solar News (the channel's parent division and content producer)
CNN Philippines
Nine Media Corporation

References

Radio Philippines Network
Southern Broadcasting Network
Former Solar Entertainment Corporation channels
Defunct television networks in the Philippines
24-hour television news channels in the Philippines
English-language television stations in the Philippines
Television channels and stations established in 2012
Television channels and stations disestablished in 2014